Oles is one of 41 parishes (administrative divisions) in Villaviciosa, a municipality within the province and autonomous community of Asturias, in coastal northern Spain. 

Villages

The villages of Oles, in their Asturian-language names, include:

 Les Areñes
 Fitories
 Llata
 La Lloraza
 Miénagos
 Oles
 Piedresblanques
 Santa Mariña
 Tueru

References

External links

 Asturian society of economic and industrial studies, English language version of "Sociedad Asturiana de Estudios Económicos e Industriales" (SADEI)

Parishes in Villaviciosa